Greta Saur (Sauer) (born 20 April 1909 in Bregenz, Austria; died 6 May 2000 in Villejuif (Val-de-Marne), France) was a German painter who lived and worked in Paris. She was an abstract painter, specifically in the style of lyrical abstraction of the "Nouvelle Ecole de Paris".

Life 
Greta Sauer (Saur) was born in Bregenz in 1909, daughter of a musician. After attending grammar school in Augsburg, she devoted herself to the study of music, philosophy (with Professor Karl Jaspers) and psychology (with Professor E. Sprenger) in Heidelberg and Berlin from 1929 to 1934. It was then that she made her first autodidactic attempts at drawing.

For political reasons, she moved to Paris in 1937 with her friend François Willi Wendt. Friendly contacts with Wassily Kandinsky, Fernand Léger, Hans Hartung, Sonia Delaunay, Alberto Giacometti and Serge Poliakoff encouraged her artistic maturation. In 1940 Saur was taken to the Gurs internment camp in France as a "feindlicher Ausländer" (lit. "enemy alien"). She found refuge with Eva Péan-Pages in the Villa Brise des Neiges in La Tronche near Grenoble.

In 1945, after the end of the war, Saur returned to Paris, first finding a studio in Rue Broca, then in Bangeux (Hauts-de-Seine), where she lived and worked.

Group exhibitions 

 1946 and following years, Salon des Réalités Nouvelles
 1950 with Georges Mathieu, Wols, Nicolas Schöffer, Galerie des Deux Iles, Paris
 1954 "Collages": Galerie Arnaud (Paris)
 1955 "Die ausgewanderten Maler - Peintres allemands émigrés en France" (with Jankel Adler, Lou Albert-Lasard, Eduard Bargheer, Max Beckmann, Francis Bott, Heinrich Campendonk, Heinrich Maria Davringhausen, Max Ernst, Otto Freundlich, Johnny Friedlaender, Hans Hartung, Paul Klee, Moissey Kogan, Jeanne Kosnik-Freundlich, Rudolf Levy, Rolf Nesch, Max Pfeiffer-Watenpuhl, Hans Purrmann, Josef Scharl, Kurt Schwitters, Ferdinand Springer, Emma Stern, François Willi Wendt and Wols), Morsbroich Castle Museum (Leverkusen)
 1959 "Nouvelle Ecole de Paris", Kunsthalle Mannheim
 1964 "Cinquante ans de collages": Musée d’art et d’industrie de Saint- Etienne (France)
 1964 International exhibition with collages at the Musée des Arts Décoratifs in Paris
 1981 Group exhibition with Y. Baume, Bohm, Esther Hess, F. Limerat, Louttre. B, C. Maillard, Robert Saint-Criq, R. Thévenot, Marcel Van Thienen, Galerie Le Temps de voir (Dir. G. Thévenot)
 Participation in several group exhibitions in France, Denmark, Italy, USA, Great Britain ...

Solo exhibitions 

 1948 Galerie du Montparnasse, Paris, France
 1950 "Gouaches et pastels", Galerie de Beaune, Paris, France
 1951 "Gouaches" (with Stephen Gilbert), Galerie Arnaud, Paris, France
 1952 Galerie Arnaud, Paris, France
 1960 Galerie du Pont Royal (Dir. Irma Hoenigsberg), Paris, France
 1961 "Peintures", Galerie du Pont Royal, Paris, France
 1963 "Collages", Galerie du Pont Royal, Paris, France
 1963 "Peintures et collages" (with François Willi Wendt), Städtisches Museum von Trier
 1971 "Peintures, collages, objets d’ombre", Centre Culturel Communal de Bagneux, Hauts-de-Seine, France
 1986 "Collages et objets d’ombre", Galerie Sud - Centre culturel communal de Bagneux, France

Bibliography 

 "Dictionnaire de la peinture abstraite" by Michel Seuphor (1957 - Editions Hazan)
 "Peintres d’origine allemande en France : Francis Bott, Leo Breuer, Heinrich Maria Davringhausen/Davring, Max Ernst, Adolf Fleischmann, Albert Flocon, Otto Freundlich, Johnny Friedlaender, Hans Hartung, Jean Leppien, Hans Reichel, Greta Sauer/Saur, Ferdinand Springer, Wols et François Willi Wendt" by Roger Van Gindertael in Allemagne d’aujourd’hui n° 4 et 5 (1957)
 Catalog of the exhibition "Greta Saur - François Willi Wendt", 1963 - Städtisches Museum von Trier
 "Le collage" by Françoise Monnin (1996 - Art du vingtième siècle, Editions Fleurus-Idées)

External links 

 

2000 deaths
1909 births
Art Informel and Tachisme
Abstract painters
German expatriates in France
German women painters
20th-century German painters
20th-century German women
Austro-Hungarian emigrants to Germany